Shortland Street is a New Zealand television soap opera. It was first broadcast on 25 May 1992 and currently airs on television network TVNZ 2. The following is a list of characters that appeared on the show in 2018 by order of first appearance. All characters are introduced by the shows executive producer Maxine Fleming. The 26th season of Shortland Street began airing on 15 January 2018.

Dion Tai

Dion Tai, played by Sonny Tupu, made his first appearance on 23 January 2018.

Dion arrives at the hospital as a famous rugby league star for a charity photo shoot. Upon running into the star struck Jack (Reuben Milner), he shocked all by outwardly discriminating on him for his sexuality and appearing to flirt with Sass Warner (Lucy Lovegrove). However upon running into Jack again, it transpired that Dion himself was closeted gay and in fact attracted to Jack. The two began a casual relationship with Dion too afraid to come out due to his high-profile rugby league career. However, with the ultimatum offered of losing Jack, Dion came out on national television and the two entered a loving committed relationship. Shortly into the relationship Dion began having health problems and was devastatingly diagnosed with terminal melanoma. He retired from sport and despite initial hesitation, allowed Jack to nurse him; eventually dying in his arms. He consumed brownies laced with medicinal marijuana. Weeks after his death, Damo, who was dieting, consumed them, and became badly impaired with hallucinations.

Zoe Carlson

Zoe Carlson, played by Holly Shervey, made her first screen appearance on 9 April 2018. She initially stayed with Vinnie and Nicole's place, but when she overstayed her welcome, the couple tried to get rid of her, but when Zoe left bad reviews, it turned out that she is the younger sister of Kate Nathan. She was mismatched by Dawn to be Curtis' love interest, but Dawn has no idea that Zoe is Curtis' step-aunt. She got the PA job after Leanne was recovering from a broken wrist and Sass Warner moving to Italy to take care of Hawks, despite her lack of experience. She has developed feelings for Chris Warner. On the day when she was supposed to be fired from the job, she emotionally blackmailed Chris by disclosing her false cancer claim. Before Chris almost saw through her lies, Zoe managed to re-cover her story by saying her cancer is Hodgkin's Lymphoma, which is a far more treatable form. Finn, however, is still warning his father to fire her regardless. After taking care of a terminal patient by reading to her, her guilt finally overwhelms her after she passes away. On 7 May, when she tried to show signs of her illness as she felt threatened by Chris hiring an accountant that can double as a PA, Damo forced Zoe to confess to Kate after Chris somewhat covered up for her. She managed to cover it up for an extra week because she was able to fundraise for extra funding. When Chris and Zoe finally announced their relationship, Zoe found out she was pregnant, when Chris had to rush to Shanghai as Zhilan, Chris' daughter-in-law, went into labour months early. Zoe and Kate also found out that Nicole Miller has been their half-sister all along when Neville Carlson, their father, found Leanne and tried to reconcile.
However, after Chris Warner returned, Jarryd returned and demanded money from her, which Zoe lied about him being abusive towards her, so she rescinded her resignation, Te Rongopai and Nicole saw through Leanne's attempt to get her job back, so Zoe was reassigned to work alongside her on the reception desk, while the role of PA was filled by a young man with MBA, but he left for better offers.

The baby's scan shows that she is smaller than normal, and is later diagnosed to have high risk of Down's Syndrome. Chris suggests Zoe has an abortion, thinking she will never cope, but Zoe is deeply offended. Chris blames himself for possibly passing his genes on due to him being an older father, but finally gives Zoe credit. After helping Finn get reinstated as a surgeon, the two admit feelings for each other while realising their relationship is a bad idea. Chris walks in on the pair after the second time they kiss, ending his relationship with Zoe and disowning Finn. After being thrown out of Chris' house, Zoe would be attacked by the Beechwood Beast, being raped and brutally assaulted. Being admitted to Shortland Street, Zoe is told she has miscarried her baby.

Dylan Reinhart
             
Dylan Reinhart, played by Ryan O'Kane, made his first appearance on 18 April 2018. He found a weakened Erin Landry when she left Vinnie's House without her son. After a clash with Kylie in the emergency room, she was introduced by the returning Julia as her husband, in which both are remarried. He was originally working as a GP in Central Hospital, having worked in the lower South Island, and previously attended university in Otago with Boyd Rolleston (Sam Bunkall) and was then was later hired as ED Consultant and GP, where his terms of contract were leaked by Zoe to the staff. He also seemingly undermined Harper Whitley's (Ria Vandervis) authority over treatment plans, but he is proven to be correct afterward, angering Harper while starting a rivalry with Harper's husband Drew (Ben Barrington). Dylan would be chastised by his sister-in-law Kylie Brown (Kerry-Lee Dewing) as well as hospital CEO Chris Warner (Michael Galvin) over paying for a poor patient's medical bills with his own money. After a tennis game at Dylan and Julia's mansion, Kylie would miscarry the child she was carrying and Dylan and Julia would agree for Julia to be Kylie and husband Frank Warner's (Luke Patrick) surrogate mother. However, around this time Dylan would confess his lustful feelings toward Kylie.

Dylan then finds Miranda, the sister of his ex-wife Cassidy and the two clash before Miranda departs, leaving Julia with an ominous warning about Dylan. Dylan would begin to snap and tell Julia he hated her and was after her sister shortly before he sabotaged Julia's seatbelt while driving one day and then killing her by crashing into a tree and fiddling with her life support system.

Dylan would begin to spend his insurance payout while showing a strange lack of grief towards the death of his wife which would irk and pique the curiosity of Frank and Dylan would begin to manipulate promiscuous nurse Dawn Robinson (Rebekah Palmer) into sleeping with him and then to dump her boyfriend Ali Karim (Tane Williams-Accra).

Dylan would go on a fishing excursion with Frank at Kylie's behest, having fantasies about murdering Frank the entire time. However, on 31 August, Frank paid off ex-gang member Skinny to scare off Dylan, which he went overboard and almost killed him, and Frank exacerbated by choking him half to death, when Dylan threatened to sue Frank. But in doing so, he can make Kylie leave Frank and be with Dylan, seeing he already dumped Dawn. In December, he engaged with Kylie, but the reappearance of his twin brother, Daniel, dug up the really bad past that tore the twins apart, as Daniel dated Dylan's ex-wife, Stephanie, who Dylan killed by car accident, similar way that Julia was killed.  In the lead-up to the 2018 Christmas cliffhanger, Dylan and Kylie embark on their honeymoon where partway through the drive, Kylie receives texts from Harper warning her about how Dylan killed his two previous wives, but it was too late for Kylie to realise Dan had been truthful all along about his plans to commit murder for insurance fraud. Kylie realized his plans and tried to kill her on the way to honeymoon. Kylie initially rescued him, but killed him off on the final episode of 2018 by asphyxiation.

He made sporadic returns in 2019 as Kylie's evil conscience before and after she married Dan.

Becky Reid

Becky Reid, played by Awhimai Fraser, made her first appearance on 24 April 2018. Becky first appeared at a hen's night in the IV Bar, engaging in a slanging contest with and then eventually ending up in bed with Curtis Hannah (Jayden Daniels). It would then be revealed that Becky is the bride, with her husband being Curtis' police trainer, Tank Reid (Jack Barry). Panicking at first, the smitten Curtis would continue to pursue the married Becky, who also ended up being a nurse at Shortland Street. Upon reflection, Becky realised she was more in love with Curtis than her husband, leading to her separating from Tank and entering a relationship with the new police officer Curtis.

Tank Reid

Thomas "Tank" Reid, played by Jack Barry made his first appearance on 3 May 2018. Tank is Curtis Hannah's (Jayden Daniels) trainer from Ferndale Police, and Becky Reid's (Awhimai Fraser) husband. He goes to the IV Bar when Becky throws him out of the house. Curtis beats him in a fitness drill in the morning, so he decides to shorten the practice. However, just as Tank is about to have a final round of drinks with Curtis, he tears his right meniscus and requires surgery. When Becky tries to end their marriage, Tank loses control and becomes extremely vengeful. Tank tries to test Curtis during the later fitness tests. When he finds out that Becky had an affair with Curtis, Tank lets him fall down the obstacle wall, but decides to help him finish his apprenticeship, provided Becky and Curtis never see each other again. Curtis graduates after Becky and Tank end their marriage. Tank suffers injuries after he has a driving accident. He recovers and returns when his father is admitted due to a heart attack.

With his father also feeling bad that Becky left Tank for an ex-con, Tank verbally abuses Curtis, while speaking ill of Pixie Hannah (Thomasin McKenzie), which causes the latter to snap. After the scuffle, Tank admits that his father put him up to it. Tank is prescribed diazepam. A day later, CCTV footage identifies him as being within the vicinity of an attack by the serial sex offender, the Beechwood Beast. Tank is taken in for questioning after Curtis and Darryl review the footage. However, the morning after Zoe Carlson (Holly Shervey) is raped, Curtis sees Tank hiding a mask, heightening his likelihood of being the sex offender, until Kate Hannah (Laurie Devenie) realises that he is covering for his father, Ian Reid (Phil Vaughan). The suspects' blood type is later found to be a match for Ian. He was still charged with perversion of justice.

Te Rongopai Rameka

Te Rongopai Rameka, played by Kim Garrett, first appeared on 13 June 2018, as the acting CEO of Shortland Street in the absence of Chris Warner (Michael Galvin) by the DHB, to the annoyance of Drew McCaskill (Ben Barrington). Te Rongopai pursued an agenda almost instantly, claiming such concepts as white privilege and nepotism, attempting to undermine things done by Chris in his time in charge, such as terminating the employment of Chris's son Frank Warner (Luke Patrick) while favouring Maori members of staff by way of things such as giving Esther a paid working study program top further her skills as an emergency surgeon, while giving her time to heal her injuries inflicted upon her by another of Chris' sons, Esther's ex husband, disgraced former surgeon Finn (Lukas Whiting), and introducing a free Maori Language tuition program. Te Rongopai's husband, Pita (Jamie MacCaskill)  was the Maori Minister of Health, with much of his work happening in Wellington, where he looked after their daughter Rangimarie, herself a part-time activist.

Upon Chris's return, Te Rongopai would stay on as a permanent second-in-charge of Shortland Street Hospital in the position of Chief Operating Officer. Soon after the return of Chris, Te Rongopai finds that her husband is having an affair with his secretary, so she ends the marriage. Taking charge of the hospital again in Chris' absence, Te Rongopai would get into a relationship with Dr Boyd Rolleston (Sam Bunkall), but it did not last for long when she briefly got back with Pita just to keep Rangimarie happy. But as of December, 2018, her feelings with TK returned, she broke off with Pita for good.

Professionally, due to her manipulating the donor's list to use Kawe's deceased heart to save Esther Samuels, she was stood down from holding high managerial and clinical positions, and can only work as an administrative advisor. However, with Drew's home detention due to tax fraud, Te Rongopai became a non-clinical 2IC of Shortland Street by default.

In 2019, however, due to Drew being stood down, and Chris being injured from the plane accident, Te Rongopai resumed her role as acting CEO, where she met Hawks Logan for the first time, and tried to link him up with Ester, without knowing that he is already in a relationship with Sass.

On 5 May 2019, after breaking up with TK after he cheated on her to be with Kylie, she was stabbed in the abdomen my Charlie, who was on a meth-induced hallucination and rage. After coronal bypass surgery, she was in a drug-induced coma overnight. However, shortly after awaking from her coma, she suffered ventricular tachycardia, which worsened to ventricular fibrillation. She was about to be pronounced dead, but TK's extended CPR saved her life. Despite this, TK decides not to be back with Te Rongopai, and she becomes determined to find the secret about him killing Hayden to save Kylie.

She made her return in 2022, as she worked in the DHB itself to promote Maori heath, and she kept pushing TK Samuels to work in Wellington with her. However, upon hearing his prostate cancer diagnosis, and Zoe Carlson's lawsuit against Chris Warner, and Warner's ancient racist video against Chris Warner, she also pushed guided TK into the role of CEO, while also had an affair with him to prove his sexual prowess Desi let Tillie Potts (Tk Samuels daughter) know about his affair with Te Rongpai while Tk Samuels was in a relationship with Cece King

Pita Rameka

Pita Rameka, played by Jamie MacCaskill, made his first appearance on 8 July 2018, accompanying his wife Te Rongopai (Kim Garrett) to the housewarming party of Drew McCaskill (Ben Barrington) and Harper Whitley (Ria Vandervis). It was revealed by Drew that Pita is the Maori Minister of Health, based out of Wellington. Pita tried to offer TK Samuels (Ben Mitchell) a role in the Ministry, despite him being against the euthanasia legalisation bill, which was rejected by TK.

Pita would then have a role in his nephew, Kawe Osbourne (James Rolleston) getting a job running a coffee cart outside of the hospital and then next appear in time to be blasted by orderly Jack Hannah (Reuben Milner) for the unreasonable staffing levels at the hospital which necessitated Jack working multiple 12 hour shifts and being forced to do things such as inject morphine outside of his job description. To add further insult to injury, Pita's secretary, Keira, would out the affair the two were having behind Te Rongopai's back.

Pita was later mentioned that he has moved to Australia to be with Keira. In 2019, he was mentioned to have suffered stage 2 bowel cancer.

Tim Myers

Tim Myers, played by Jamie Wells, made his first appearance on 9 July 2018. He first appeared from 9 July 2018 to 1 August 2018 and returned on 15 October 2019 as regular character.

He arrived on as an ambo recruit and he advised Ali Karmin to stay away from Dawn Robinson. as he is also a single man who seemed to had been hurt by former partners before, which made him extremely cynical and sceptical towards love and romance. He then became extremely vindictive and hateful towards Dawn, leading him to be suspected as the serial rapist. However, when he returned late in July, he started stalking Nicole, which confirmed that he is the one harassing Nicole after she rejected his advances multiple times. He barged into her house on 3 August, the same day that an unknown assailant stole oxycodone from the hospital (Becky), then knocked Dawn out cold after she tried to make a failed citizen's arrest. He returned October 2019 much to the shock of Nicole Miller and started a relationship with Shereez Baker not knowing to her that he is partnered with hospital bomber.

After a patient comes in and recognises Tim as her ex-girlfriend, Zara tells Tim to stay away from her and he tells her to go back to India. Zara shouts out that Tim is a racist, and Tim reports her to Human Resources.
In December, leading up to the cliffhanger, he proposes to Shareez and she accepts. Shareez talks to Sam, the psychiatrist about her relationship with Tim, and Shareez tells Tim what they talked about. Tim enters Sam's home and he assaults Sam, leaving Sam with a brain injury. In 2019 season finale he held Boyd and Zara and Chris hostage in his office before taking Boyd and Zara in an ambo and he blowns out it up. it was revealed in 2020 opener that Tim passed in the blast ending his reign of terror forever.

Ian Reid

Ian Reid played by Phil Vaughan first appeared on 24 July 2018.   Ian was Tank Reid's (Jack Barry) father and Becky Reid's (Awhimai Fraser) former father-in-law. A retired cop, Ian suffered a heart attack and needs stents. He authorises arrest warrants when Curtis Hannah (Jayden Daniels) is charged with the attempted arson of Chris Warner's house after Pixie Hannah dies in 2015, which leads him to believe he is undeserving to be a cop. Ian would be revealed as the Beechwood Beast, the serial rapist responsible for a rape which took place in 2017, as well as an assault on Kate Hannah (Laurel Devenie) as well as attempted attacks on Nicole Miller (Sally Martin) and Dawn Robinson (Rebekah Palmer).

Prior to being revealed as the serial rapist, Ian would be admitted to the hospital with a number of health problems. Being tended to by Becky, Ian would attempt to manipulate his daughter-in-law into getting back together with Tank as well as goading Tank into provoking a fight with Curtis Hannah by having Tank mock the death of Pixie. After being discharged, Ian wouldn't be heard from personally for another month until being admitted into hospital again. In the meantime, Ian would bludgeon former police officer Clint Allen (Ryan Lampp) for trying to identify the serial rapist. Upon admission into hospital again, Ian would claim his facial injuries were the result of walking into a door, which Curtis and Becky being certain his injuries were assault injuries inflicted by Tank. After being discharged again, Ian would attack and rape Zoe Carlson (Holly Shervey) causing severe injuries and a miscarriage of her baby. When Curtis tested Tank for DNA after catching Tank on CCTV footage near the park where Dawn was almost attacked weeks prior, Kate would identify Ian as the serial rapist as his AB+ blood type is a positive match as opposed to Tank's blood type.

Becky would visit Ian to inform him of Tank being taken in for questioning and discover the bite marks Zoe left on Ian's arm while attempting to change his dressing on his wound. As Ian was attacking Becky, Kate would arrive and attack Ian for raping her sister. The police would then arrive, restrain Kate and arrest Ian. Upon arrest, it was revealed that Ian was guilty of several assaults which took place over the years in Ferndale, including one in 1993.

Ian was eventually charged and is and was sentenced to prison. When he returns in December, he was found to be attacked in prison, and was admitted to Shortland Street. When he did, he was killed by a female assailant.

Kawe Osbourne

Kawe Osbourne, played by James Rolleston, first appeared on 25 July 2018. Kawe first arrived as the owner of a coffee cart causing Drew McCaskill's (Ben Barrington) cafe to lose business. It was revealed that Kawe was the nephew of Te Rongopai (Kim Garrett) and Pita Rameka (Jamie MacCaskill) and was hired due to his familial connections within the hospital.  It also turned out that Kawe and Esther Samuels (Ngahuia Piripi) previously dated and split up when Kawe went to jail for a car accident he was responsible for previous to Esther working at Shortland Street. Upon reaching an agreement with Drew to teach the cafeteria and IV Bar staff how to make superior coffee, Kawe would clash with Esther's abusive husband, Finn Warner (Lukas Whiting).  After training Finn, and realising they both have things in common, Kawe said his goodbyes to Esther, as he was needed in a music festival up North and the two kissed. Kawe would return in September that year, but ran into trouble when one of his three coffee carts went out of commission due to a fire. He resorted to selling methamphetamine instead of taking loans from Esther or Te Rongopai. When he tried to quit that business, he was harassed by Blake's associates.

Knowing that Esther had terminal heart failure, he proposed and married her on 23 September. However, he was killed on 24 September as Trevor and his associates threw him off the balcony of the hotel, with Esther suffering a cardiac arrest from the shock. Trevor died the day after at the operating table due to brain damage. Te Rongopai tried to donate Kawe's heart to Esther as his dying wish, which is both unethical and illegal under commonwealth laws.

Lincoln Kimiora

Lincoln Kimiora, played by Alex Tarrant, made his first appearance on 1 August 2018. Lincoln made his first (naked) appearance in the men's changing rooms at the hospital introducing himself to a shocked Jack Hannah (Reuben Milner), who would be smitten by the house surgeon. However upon finding out that Lincoln was in a relationship Jack would back off and fall into bed with a young man named Connor (Jonathan James) instead. Unfortunately for Jack it would turn out that Lincoln was bisexual and his partner was none other than the unfaithful Connor.

By 28 August, he admitted that his father passed from cancer, and he has been a drug user since, when Jack found methamphetamine in his car.

After a night out of partying with Jack and Nicole, Lincoln has sex with Nicole at Jack's place. When Nicole told Leanne that she had a one-night stand with a "gay guy", Leanne later saw Nicole and Jack hugging in the IV and assumed it was Jack who she had slept with.

By September, he has been ordered by Chris Warner to stay clean, after Mo Hannah accused him of dragging Jack down when Jack had a poisoning after consuming impure batch of the drug. After helping Jack quit, he proposed to Jack and also became a surgical fellow trainee in waiting.

In November, he is engaged to Jack, and they tried to have a baby with Claire, who had feelings for Jack, but was raped by Ian Reid in June. In 2019 he got engaged and planned to marry Jack but he slept with drug dealer Charlie and got back into drugs again, which meant he lost his job at the hospital and left Ferndale after the death of his newborn daughter (with Nicole after a one-night stand) and broke up with Jack after he confessed he relapsed back into drugs and slept with Charlie and so he departed in early May 2019. In reality, Alex Tarrant was in Australia for a reboot of SeaChange.

Danielle Fox

Danielle Fox , played by Phoebe McKellar, made her first appearance on 25 September 2018. Danielle arrived in Ferndale as a candidate to be a nanny for Drew and Harper's intersex child, Billie.

Minerva McCaskill

Becky "Minerva" McCaskill, played by Yvette Parsons, made her first appearance on 4 October 2018. She arrived on the scene after Boyd Rolletion and her daughter in law Harper Whitley to track her down in order to reconciled her with her son Drew after she left him and his brother when they were children. However, she is more spiritually inclined than Leanne. Her spiritual and cryptic way of talking drove Drew mad. When she returned in 2020, she used her herbal concoction to cure Billie, who was battling a bad cough. But was later discovered to have stage 4 breast cancer that got worse despite self-medicating for months. A hardline stance was taken by Drew to take the surgical option, she relented, and performed the double mastectomy, on the condition that Drew would perform the double breast reconstruction.

Daniel Reinhart
  
Daniel Reinhart, played by Ryan O'Kane, made his first appearance on 3 December 2018.  He is the twin brother of Dylan Reinhart, who is also played by O'Kane. The actor found playing twins "really fun, especially because I had already put a bit of myself into Dylan and then when Dan came along it was like, 'How do you differentiate? How do you come up with different mannerisms?'." O'Kane was forced to shave off his beard to play Daniel, as the crew were unable to find another person with the right colouring or stubble to fill in for his shoulders and neck.

Daniel is a surgeon in Shortland Street, filling in for the suspended Boyd Rolleston. He studied in England, and is a very nerdy and a seemingly unassuming and simple-minded guy compared to his twin. However, Dylan has been resentful since Daniel had sex with his former wife, Stephanie. Daniel finds out Dylan has remarried and suspects that Dylan killed his wife Julia the same way that he killed Stephanie. This is also how Dylan is able to gain payouts from an English insurance company. Daniel and Harper Whitley believe that Kylie Brown (Kerry-Lee Dewing) is in danger, after Dylan signs Kylie up for life insurance. However, when nobody believed him, he took a role back to Arizona after he needed to follow up on his old patient.

On 12 July 2019, Daniel was found being wheeled into the emergency room from a separate car accident. Kylie confused him with Dylan, who was killed by her. He suffered a ruptured spleen and three broken ribs. It was an attempted suicide by way of drink-driving and driving while unrestrained, as he admitted to have felt guilty for Dylan's deranged demeanour. On 16 July's one-hour episode, Daniel suffered an anaphylatic episode, when he was losing his ability to breathe after a reaction to an antibiotic. After he was saved by Kylie, Daniel gave up his suicide attempts, but Kylie freaked out a day later. He had a short marriage to Kylie, and witnessed her being baptised as a born again Christian. However, he annulled the marriage when Kylie confided that she killed Dylan.

Others

References

External links
Characters and cast at the Official TVNZ website

2018
, Shortland Street